"Don't Be a Fool" is a song performed by British contemporary R&B group Loose Ends, issued as the lead single from their fifth studio album Look How Long. Produced by band member Carl McIntosh, it is the first single from the band to not feature original members Jane Eugene and Steve Nichol; they both left the band following their previous album The Real Chuckeeboo and were subsequently replaced by Linda Carriere and Sunay Suleyman. Suleyman co-wrote the song with McIntosh.

"Don't Be a Fool" peaked at #10 on the Billboard R&B chart in 1990.

Chart positions

References

External links
 
 

1990 songs
1990 singles
Loose Ends (band) songs
MCA Records singles
Virgin Records singles